Curators of Sweden was a social media campaign initiated by the government agency Swedish Institute and VisitSweden on Twitter. It was launched on 10 December 2011 with the main concept of a rotating spokesperson, or rather a curator, on the official Twitter account of Sweden, @.

History 
The concept originated on 10 December 2011, when Swedish Institute and VisitSweden launched Curators of Sweden. The project hands the official Twitter account @Sweden to a new Swedish person every week to manage, with the expressed goal to manifest Swedish diversity and progressiveness through their own life, personality and views.

The campaign has been widely reported in media around the world and inspired the launch of many similar projects. The Twitter account @PeopleofLeeds started on 15 January 2012, allowing citizens of Leeds to represent their hometown. 18 January 2012, @WeAreAustralia and @TweetWeekUSA, followed by @CuratorsMexico and @BasquesAbroad on 21 January. All of these are unofficial accounts without governmental influence or sanctions, unlike @sweden. They have recently been given a concept name of Rotation Curation.

Curators of Sweden was created by the Swedish agency Volontaire. The project won The Golden Egg (Guldägget) on 17 April 2012, received gold in the Clio Awards on 15 May 2012 and was awarded Grand Prix at the Cannes Lions on 20 June 2012.

The project was closed in 2018.

Rotation Curation 
Rotation Curation, also #RotationCuration, is a social media concept where official and unofficial projects, countries, cities, companies, cultural, and, or other types of groups rotate their spokespersons, curators, every week.

Initially most of these projects all had a location in common, which saw the creation of the concept Location Curation, with the hashtag #LocationCuration. When the idea spread to organisations unbound by location the expression was abandoned. Because of their common concept of rotating the holder of the account, people on Twitter decided to use the expression #RotationCuration, which was coined by the Twitter user @auldzealand on 22 March 2012.

The block list in 2017 
In 2017, the Swedish Institute blocked 14,000 Twitter accounts from interacting with @. Among the blocked were journalists, authors, politicians (some elected members of the Riksdag), businessmen and ambassadors. When the block list was reported in the media, the Swedish Institute lifted the blocks and apologized.

When media, with support from the constitutional Principle of Public Access, asked to review the list of accounts that had been blocked the Swedish Institute deleted the document.

The Swedish Institute asked for an external review of the event. The review criticized the institute for blocking the accounts which had been done without regard of the Swedish constitution. The review also heavily criticized the institute for deleting the document in violation of the law.

References

External links 
 @sweden – Twitter
 CuratorsofSweden.com

Crowdsourcing
Internet in Sweden
Twitter accounts
Internet properties established in 2011
Internet properties disestablished in 2018